Berzelia is a genus consisting of 12 species of upright, wiry-stemmed, evergreen shrubs with a dense covering of small, fine, needle-like leaves. The flowers which appear in spring and summer, are minute but are packed in spherical clusters, of which there are several per head of bloom. The flowers are white to cream and, because the stamens extend beyond the tiny petals, the flowerheads appear to be studded with protrusions.

In cultivation, they are best grown in light well-drained soil with adequate moisture, positioning in full sun. Light trimming will retain the compact form after flowering. Most species are easily propagated from seed or small half-hardened tip cuttings.

Species
Berzelia abrotanoides   
Berzelia arachnoidea
Berzelia bruniaceae
Berzelia burchellii
Berzelia commutata
Berzelia comosa
Berzelia cordifolia
Berzelia dregeana
Berzelia ecklonii
Berzelia galpinii
Berzelia incurva
Berzelia intermedia
Berzelia lanuginosa
Berzelia rubra
Berzelia squarrosa

References
Lord, Tony (2003) Flora : The Gardener's Bible : More than 20,000 garden plants from around the world. London: Cassell.  
Botanica Sistematica

Bruniaceae
Asterid genera
Taxa named by Adolphe-Théodore Brongniart